Sacred Heart Church is a Catholic church in Gibraltar.

Description
The church is of Gothic design, the foundation stone was laid on March 25, 1874, attended by Félix María Arrieta y Llano, Bishop of Cadiz, and John Baptist Scandella, Vicar Apostolic of Gibraltar, although it was not formally blessed until July 15, 1888.

Amongst the parish priests of this church was Charles Caruana who went on to be the Roman Catholic Bishop of Gibraltar between 1998 and 2010.

In the patio of the church is a grotto dedicated to Our Lady of Lourdes.

References

Sacred Heart
Roman Catholic churches completed in 1888
19th-century Roman Catholic church buildings in the United Kingdom